Glycine—tRNA ligase also known as glycyl–tRNA synthetase is an enzyme that in humans is encoded by the GARS1 gene.

Function 

This gene encodes glycyl-tRNA synthetase, one of the aminoacyl-tRNA synthetases that charge tRNAs with their cognate amino acids. The encoded enzyme is an (alpha)2 dimer which belongs to the class II family of tRNA synthetases.

Reaction 

In enzymology, a glycine—tRNA ligase is an enzyme that catalyzes the chemical reaction

ATP + glycine + tRNAGly  AMP + diphosphate + glycyl-tRNAGly

The 3 substrates of this enzyme are ATP, glycine, and tRNA(Gly), whereas its 3 products are AMP, diphosphate, and glycyl-tRNA(Gly).

This enzyme belongs to the family of ligases, to be specific those forming carbon-oxygen bonds in aminoacyl-tRNA and related compounds.  The systematic name of this enzyme class is glycine:tRNAGly ligase (AMP-forming). Other names in common use include glycyl-tRNA synthetase, glycyl-transfer ribonucleate synthetase, glycyl-transfer RNA synthetase, glycyl-transfer ribonucleic acid synthetase, and glycyl translase.  This enzyme participates in glycine, serine and threonine metabolism and aminoacyl-trna biosynthesis.

Interactions 

Glycyl-tRNA synthetase has been shown to interact with EEF1D. Mutant forms of the protein associated with peripheral nerve disease have been shown to aberrantly bind to the transmembrane receptor proteins neuropilin 1 and Trk receptors A-C.

Clinical relevance 

Glycyl-tRNA synthetase has been shown to be a target of autoantibodies in the human autoimmune diseases, polymyositis or dermatomyositis.

The peripheral nerve diseases Charcot-Marie-Tooth disease type 2D (CMT2D) and distal spinal muscular atrophy type V (dSMA-V) have been liked to dominant mutations in GARS. CMT2D usually manifests during the teenage years, and results in muscle weakness predominantly in the hands and feet. Two mouse models of CMT2D have been used to better understand the disease, identifying that the disorder is caused by a toxic gain-of-function of the mutant glycine-tRNA ligase protein. The CMT2D mice display peripheral nerve axon degeneration  and defective development and function> of the neuromuscular junction.

References

Further reading

External links 
  GeneReviews/NCBI/NIH/UW entry on Charcot-Marie-Tooth Neuropathy Type 2
  GeneReviews/NCBI/NIH/UW entry on GARS-Associated Axonal Neuropathy, Charcot-Marie-Tooth Neuropathy Type 2D, Distal Spinal Muscular Atrophy V

EC 6.1.1
Enzymes of known structure